"King of the Kerb" is the second single from Echobelly's On released by the Britpop band Echobelly in 1995.

The song was included on both of the greatest hits albums that Echobelly have released; I Can't Imagine The World Without Me and The Best Of Echobelly. All b-sides were re-released on the expanded edition of On.

It also reached 25 in the UK Singles Chart.

Track listing

UK CD 1

All songs produced by Echobelly and recorded at Marcus a part from "King of the Kerb", produced by Paul Kolderie and Sean Slade and Recorded at  Konk Studios and Fort Apache.
"Natural Animal" and "Car Fiction" were originally released on On.

UK CD 2

All songs recorded live at wetlands preserve
"Insomniac" was originally released on Everyone's Got One
"Great Things" was originally released on On.

European CD

Australian CD

Japanese CD

Released on 24 April 1996
Atom was re-released on the greatest hits compilation I Can't Imagine The World Without Me.
Released on the label Epic/Sony.

Credits

Bass – Alexander Keyser
Drums – Andy Henderson
Guitar – Glenn Johansson
Voice – Sonya Madan
Engineer – Dick Meaney
Cover Photography – Kevin Westenberg
Producer – Echobelly

References

1995 singles
Echobelly songs
1995 songs